Hodgson Lake is a perennially ice-covered freshwater lake, which is about 2 km (1.2 mi) long by about 1.5 km (0.93 mi) wide. It is located within the southern part of Alexander Island, west of Palmer Land in Antarctica, at approximately 72°S latitude and 68°W longitude. This lake has a 93.4 m (306 ft) deep water column that lies sealed beneath a 3.6 to 4.0 m (12 to 13 ft) thick perennial lake ice. The lake is an ultra-oligotrophic lake with very low nutrient content and very low productivity. There is no detectable life living in Hodgson Lake. The lake extends eastward into George VI Sound and the George VI Ice Shelf making it adjacent to the sound. The northern side of this lake is bounded by the Saturn Glacier, which flows east into George VI Sound. The lake lies next to and southeast of Citadel Bastion, a pre-eminent mountain on Alexander Island.

Geomorphological and paleolimnological evidence indicates that Hodgson Lake had been a subglacial lake covered by an ice sheet at least 470 m (1,542 ft) thick during the Last Glacial Maximum. This ice sheet started thinning about 13,500 years ago. Eventually, it retreated from the local area of Hodgson Lake and left it covered only by perennial ice sometime before 11,000 years ago. This lake has been covered by perennial ice since that time.

The UK Antarctic Place-Names Committee named Lake Hodgson on November 20, 2007, after Dominic Hodgson, a British Antarctic Survey paleolimnologist and lead author of the discovery reports. Although he proposed that this lake be named "Citadel Lake," it was named after him. Dr. Hodgson confirmed the existence of this lake during a field reconnaissance on December 18, 2000. Later in 2009, papers, of which Dominic Hodgson is the senior coauthor, were published about the limnology and paleolimnology of Hodgson Lake in Quaternary Science Reviews.

See also
Lake Ellsworth
Lake Vostok
Lakes of Antarctica

References

External links
Anonymous (2009) Exploring Hodgson Lake Planet Earth Online, Natural Environment Research Council.

Lakes of Antarctica
Bodies of water of Alexander Island
Subglacial lakes